Regina Masli born 1940,  is a former Indonesian badminton player in the 70s.

Profile
Regina Masli is a female badminton athlete who specializes in women's doubles and mixed doubles, she played a big role in Indonesia's success in winning the  1975 Uber Cup  for the first time from Japan in 1975, she won two women's doubles matches with Minarni against Japanese women's doubles. Regina Masli also won the mixed doubles at the 1974 Asian Games with Christian Hadinata and the women's doubles champion at the 1976 Asian Championships with Theresia Widiastuti.

Achievements

Asian Games 

Mixed doubles

Asian Championships 

Women's doubles

International Open Tournaments (2 titles) 

Women's doubles

Mixed doubles

Invitational Tournaments 

Women's doubles

Mixed doubles

References 

1940 births
Living people
Indonesian female badminton players
Asian Games medalists in badminton
Badminton players at the 1974 Asian Games
Asian Games gold medalists for Indonesia
Asian Games silver medalists for Indonesia
Medalists at the 1974 Asian Games